Pa Umor is a settlement in the Marudi division of Sarawak, Malaysia.

The village lies about an hour’s walk east of Bario, and is only a few kilometres from the Indonesian border. There is a salt spring close to Pa Umor, significant because, without a local source of salt, inhabitants would have to travel to the coast for it.

In 2007 the village population was made up of about forty Kelabit families.

Neighbouring settlements include:

References

Villages in Sarawak